Harts is a surname. Notable people with the surname include:

 Greg Harts (born 1950), American baseball player
 John A. Harts (1873–1947), Oklahoma Sooners football coach
 Shaunard Harts (born 1978), American football player

See also
 Hart (surname)